UDP-N-acetylmuramoyl-L-alanyl-D-glutamate—2,6-diaminopimelate ligase (MurE synthetase, UDP-N-acetylmuramoyl-L-alanyl-D-glutamate:meso-2,6-diamino-heptanedioate ligase (ADP-forming), UDP-N-acetylmuramoyl-L-alanyl-D-glutamyl-meso-2,6-diaminopimelate synthetase, UDP-N-acetylmuramoylalanyl-D-glutamate—2,6-diaminopimelate ligase) is an enzyme with systematic name UDP-N-acetylmuramoyl-L-alanyl-D-glutamate:meso-2,6-diaminoheptanedioate gamma-ligase (ADP-forming). This enzyme catalyses the following chemical reaction

 ATP + UDP-N-acetylmuramoyl-L-alanyl-D-glutamate + meso-2,6-diaminoheptanedioate  ADP + phosphate + UDP-N-acetylmuramoyl-L-alanyl-D-gamma-glutamyl-meso-2,6-diaminoheptanedioate

This enzyme takes part in synthesis of a cell-wall peptide.

References

External links 
 

EC 6.3.2